Herring Neck is a local service district and designated place in the Canadian province of Newfoundland and Labrador. It is on the northeastern extremity of New World Island, Notre Dame Bay. The community encompasses several small contiguous communities such as Merritt's Harbour, Hatchet Harbour, Salt Harbour, and Sunnyside. The name has changed many times in its history; at one time the area now called Herring Neck was called Goshen's Arm and the areas now called Pike's Arm and Green Cove was called Herring Neck.

The origin of the name comes from the early fishermen's practice of portaging loads of herring across the narrow neck of Pike's Arm. This was necessary to avoid the journey around the arm and the treacherous headwaters.

It is believed the first European settler of the area was Jimmy Chant in the 1760s. It first appeared in the Census of 1845 with a population of 546, which included the surrounding settlements as noted above. By 1857 the population had reached 610 and peaked out near 1000 in the 1880s. It remained around that figure until the 1930s, from where it has steadily declined to 607 in the 1981 census and to 20 in the 2016. The population has continued to decline due to the cod moratorium and the downsizing of the fish processing plant in the community. Many have left the community to seek employment in larger communities.

In November 1908 at the Orange Hall, William Coaker gathered together a group of fisherman to form what became later the Fishermen's Protective Union, which became a powerful, though short-lived political entity within the House of Assembly of the Dominion of Newfoundland.

Herring Neck held a Come Home Year in the summer of 2014 and continues to hold an annual festival by the name of the "Herring Neck Dory Festival" on the second last weekend of July.

Geography 
Herring Neck is in Newfoundland within Subdivision H of Division No. 8.

Demographics 

Government 
Herring Neck is a local service district (LSD) that is governed by a committee responsible for the provision of certain services to the community. The chair of the LSD committee is James King.

See also 
List of communities in Newfoundland and Labrador
List of designated places in Newfoundland and Labrador
List of local service districts in Newfoundland and Labrador

References 

Populated coastal places in Canada
Designated places in Newfoundland and Labrador
Local service districts in Newfoundland and Labrador